Christos Katrantzis (born 30 March 1992) is a Greek swimmer. He competed in the men's 4 × 100 metre freestyle relay event at the 2016 Summer Olympics. The team finished 10th in the heats and did not qualify for the final.

References

External links
 

1992 births
Living people
Greek male swimmers
Olympic swimmers of Greece
Swimmers at the 2016 Summer Olympics
Place of birth missing (living people)
Mediterranean Games bronze medalists for Greece
Mediterranean Games medalists in swimming
Swimmers at the 2013 Mediterranean Games
Greek male freestyle swimmers